A list of films produced by the Bollywood film industry based in Mumbai in 1962:

Highest-grossing films
The twelve highest-grossing films at the Indian Box Office in 1962:

A-B

C-K

L-P

R-Z

References

External links
 Bollywood films of 1962 at the Internet Movie Database
 Indian Film Songs from the Year 1962 - A look back at 1962 with a special focus on Hindi film songs

1962
Bollywood
Films, Bollywood